National Highway 123, commonly referred to as NH 123 is a national highway in  India. It is a spur road of National Highway 23. NH-123 traverses the states of Rajasthan and Uttar Pradesh in India.

Route 
Dholpur, Sepau, Sarendhi, Ghatoli, Rupbas, Khanuawa(Khanua), Uncha Nagla.

Junctions  

  Terminal near Dholpur.
  Terminal near Uncha Nagla.

See also 
 List of National Highways in India by highway number
 List of National Highways in India by state

References

External links 

 NH 123 on OpenStreetMap

National highways in India
National Highways in Uttar Pradesh
National Highways in Rajasthan